Lee Young-suk (born 9 May 1970) is a retired South Korean badminton player who affiliates with Busan City Hall since 1988. She is considered one of the most talented women's players with her exceptional speed around the court and power. She was the champion at the 1987 Denmark Open, 1988 Hong Kong Open, and 1990 Indonesia Open. At her peak, she was once ranked World No. 2 in women's singles. 

After retiring from competitive play in the mid-1990s, she worked as a head coach at the Lee Jae Bok International Badminton Academy (LIBA) in Northampton, England. She is now the chairman of Hongsung badminton club in South Korea.

Achievements

Asian Games 
Women's singles

IBF World Grand Prix 
The World Badminton Grand Prix sanctioned by International Badminton Federation (IBF) from 1983 to 2006.

Women's singles

Women's doubles

IBF International 
Women's singles

Women's doubles

Invitational Tournament 

Women's singles

Women's doubles

References

External links 
 

1970 births
Living people
Sportspeople from Busan
South Korean female badminton players
Badminton players at the 1990 Asian Games
Asian Games silver medalists for South Korea
Asian Games bronze medalists for South Korea
Asian Games medalists in badminton
Medalists at the 1990 Asian Games
World No. 1 badminton players